North Central Collegiate Hockey Association (NCCHA) was an ACHA Division III ice hockey league comprising smaller colleges and universities in Western and Northern Plains portions of the United States.

History
The NCCHA began in 2008, and was made up of teams from the defunct Great Plains Collegiate Hockey Association which was in existence since 1993 and the addition of some independent schools from ACHA Division 3 Pacific Region. The conference only lasted a few seasons.

Teams
 Air Force Academy
 Colorado College
 Creighton University
 Dordt College
 Iowa State University
 Colorado Mesa University
 University of Nebraska
 University of South Dakota
 South Dakota State University
 University of Wyoming

Champions
2010 Iowa State University
2009 Dordt College

References

External links
 NCCHA Hockey

See also
American Collegiate Hockey Association
List of ice hockey leagues

ACHA Division 3 conferences